Anna Valeryevna Cholovyaga is a former Russian football midfielder, who played for WFC Rossiyanka in the Russian Championship and the Russian national team.

She started her career in Zvezda Zvenigorod. In 2010, she moved to WFC Rossiyanka, with which she made her UEFA Champions League debut in the 2010–11 season. She has won two leagues and one cup with Rossiyanka.

A former under-19 international, in 2012 she made her debut for the senior Russian national team in the 2013 UEFA Euro's qualifying, where she made three appearances. She wasn't called up for the final tournament.

Personal life
Her husband Kirill Zaika is a professional football player.

References

1992 births
Living people
People from Murmansk Oblast
Russian women's footballers
Russia women's international footballers
WFC Rossiyanka players
Women's association football midfielders
Universiade silver medalists for Russia
Universiade medalists in football
Medalists at the 2017 Summer Universiade
Sportspeople from Murmansk Oblast
Russian Women's Football Championship players
UEFA Women's Euro 2017 players